= Parasite experiment =

In experimental physics, and particularly in high energy and nuclear physics, a parasite experiment or parasitic experiment is an experiment performed using a big particle accelerator or other large facility, without interfering with the scheduled experiments of that facility. This allows the experimenters to proceed without the usual competitive time scheduling procedure. These experiments may be instrument tests or experiments whose scientific interest has not been clearly established.
